Héctor Israel Ortiz Ortiz (born 28 July 1950 in Oaxaca) is a Mexican lawyer and politician who served as Governor of Tlaxcala.

Professional career
Héctor Ortiz holds a bachelor's degree in law. He has been professor of law at the Universidad Autónoma de Tlaxcala (UAT) since 1974. Ortiz also served as Rector of the UAT from 1983 to 1987 and again from 1999 to 2000. From 1990 to 1991 he served as Secretary of Education of the State of Tlaxcala. He served in the lower house of the Mexican Congress during the LV (1991 to 1994) and the LVIII Legislatures. In 2002 he was elected mayor of Tlaxcala.   
    
Ortiz joined the Institutional Revolutionary Party (PRI) in 1967 and was an active member until 2004, when he resigned from the PRI after losing the party's internal bid for the governorship of Tlaxcala. He then accepted the invitation from the National Action Party (PAN) to run for the governorship as the PAN candidate; he won the election held on November 14, 2004, and took office on January 14, 2005.

See also
List of Mexican state governors

References

External links
 Héctor Ortiz at the Tlaxcala.gob website

   
   

1950 births
Living people
Politicians from Oaxaca
20th-century Mexican lawyers
National Autonomous University of Mexico alumni
Members of the Chamber of Deputies (Mexico)
Municipal presidents in Tlaxcala
National Action Party (Mexico) politicians
Governors of Tlaxcala
Institutional Revolutionary Party politicians
20th-century Mexican politicians
21st-century Mexican politicians
Academic staff of the Autonomous University of Tlaxcala
Heads of universities and colleges in Mexico
People from Oaxaca City
Deputies of the LVIII Legislature of Mexico